Tanaff Arrondissement is an arrondissement of the Sédhiou Department in the Sédhiou Region of Senegal.

Subdivisions
The arrondissement is divided administratively into rural communities and in turn into villages.

References

Arrondissements of Senegal
Sédhiou Region